Grenada Lake is a reservoir on the Yalobusha River in the U.S. state of Mississippi. It is one of four flood control lakes in North Mississippi constructed by the U.S. Army Corps of Engineers. Grenada Lake was constructed to help control flooding along the Yazoo River Basin. The dam is located on the Yalobusha River approximately 3 miles (5 km) northeast of Grenada, Mississippi.

The operation of Grenada Lake began in 1954 after a cost of $32 million to construct. The elevation of the top of the earthen-filled dam is  NGVD.

Flood control is the primary purpose of the Grenada Lake Project. The Mississippi River Basin Flood Control Project was the direct result of the Great Flood of 1927. The levees which were the only protection against flooding at the time, broke along the Mississippi and Arkansas Rivers, literally swamping thousands of acres of land in Mississippi, Louisiana, and Arkansas.

Even though the Corps of Engineers main objective is flood control, Federal Legislation calls for other activities on Corps of Engineers Lands. Since its impoundment, Grenada Lake has attracted an ever-increasing number of visitors who enjoy water-based and other outdoor recreational activities and is host to several fishing tournaments annually as well.

Grenada Lake is the home to Hugh White State Park and its associated Carver Point Group Camp.  Many other campgrounds are located around the lake.

External links
Grenada Lake  - USACE official web page.
Mississippi Department of Fisheries, Wildlife & Parks: Hugh White, Grenada, Mississippi.

Protected areas of Grenada County, Mississippi
Reservoirs in Mississippi
Protected areas of Yalobusha County, Mississippi
Dams in Mississippi
United States Army Corps of Engineers dams
Landforms of Yalobusha County, Mississippi
Landforms of Grenada County, Mississippi